St. Gabriel's Catholic Parish Complex is a historic Roman Catholic church complex located at 122-142 S. Wyoming Street in Hazleton, Luzerne County, Pennsylvania within the Diocese of Scranton.

Description
The St. Gabriel's complex consists of the church (1925), rectory (1907-1908), and former convent (1937).  The church is a high French Gothic Revival steel frame building clad in pink granite ashlar with Indiana limestone trim.  It features twin bell towers with triple entrance portals at the front facade.  The rectory is a three-story, wood-frame building in the Colonial Revival style.  The convent was designed by architect Anthony J. DePace (1892–1977), and is a four-story building clad in granite ashlar and limestone. It was converted to affordable apartments and offices in 1998–1999. The church was founded in 1855. It merged with Annunciation Parish.
It was added to the National Register of Historic Places in 2002.

References

External links

St. Gabriel's Catholic Church website

Roman Catholic churches completed in 1908
Churches on the National Register of Historic Places in Pennsylvania
Gothic Revival church buildings in Pennsylvania
Colonial Revival architecture in Pennsylvania
Churches in Luzerne County, Pennsylvania
Hazleton, Pennsylvania
National Register of Historic Places in Luzerne County, Pennsylvania
1908 establishments in Pennsylvania
20th-century Roman Catholic church buildings in the United States